The 2022 Fanatec GT2 European Series is the second season of the GT2 European Series. The season began on 1 April at Imola Circuit in Imola and ended on 16 October at Circuit Paul Ricard in Le Castellet.

Calendar
The 2022 calendar was released during the annual SRO press conference on 10 October 2021, featuring six rounds. The Red Bull Ring and Circuit Ricardo Tormo marked additions from the 2021 schedule, while the event at the Hockenheimring was not renewed for 2022. On 29 October 2021, another change to the schedule was announced, moving the opening round from Monza to Imola and staging the event one week earlier.

Series News
The points format received an update for the 2022 season. Only the best five rounds from each team would count towards the overall championship.

Entry List

Race results
Bold indicates overall winner

Championship standings
Scoring system
Championship points are awarded for the first ten positions in each race. Entries are required to complete 75% of the winning car's race distance in order to be classified and earn points.

Drivers' championships

Notes:
  – Entry did not finish the race but was classified, as it completed more than 75% of the race distance.

References

External links

GT2 European Series